= Percy Kent =

English footballer

Personal information
- Full name: Percy West Kent
- Date of birth: 1897
- Place of birth: Grimsby, England
- Position: Winger

Senior career*
Years	Team	Apps	(Gls)
1919–1920	Blackpool	7	(0)
1920–1921	Grimsby Town	1	(0)
- * Club domestic league appearances and goals

Percy West Kent (1897 – after 1920) was an English professional footballer who played as a winger.
